Jumping Into the World is the first special album (or 1.5 album) by South Korean singer BoA, released on March 8, 2001. It consisted of eight new tracks along English and Chinese versions of the songs "Don't Start Now", "사라 (SARA)", "ID; Peace B". In Korea, the album was titled Don't Start Now.

Track listing

Charts

Weekly charts

Monthly charts

Release history

References 

BoA albums
2001 EPs
SM Entertainment EPs
Korean-language EPs